This article is a list of illegal migrant vehicle incidents in Europe, involving injury and/or loss of life. Illegal migrants to Europe who have boarded transport vehicles have occasionally been injured or killed in crashes or suffocation incidents.  – either unintentionally or deliberately – as a result of migrant activity.

List

References

Europe transport-related lists
Immigration-related lists
Lists of transport accidents and incidents
Vehicle